Paul Whiting was a highly influential New Zealand yacht designer during the 1970s and early 1980s.

He followed Bruce Farr in challenging accepted notions of offshore racing yacht design.

Whiting was lost at sea in 1980 on his return from the Sydney to Hobart Yacht Race in Smackwater Jack. A search failed to find any trace of the yacht or its crew.   A 2008 newspaper report stated that part of the cockpit was found at Ripiro Beach on the west coast of the North Island.

References

20th-century New Zealand people
New Zealand yacht designers
Year of birth missing
1980 deaths
Boating accident deaths